The draw for the 2022 FIFA World Cup took place on 1 April 2022 at the Exhibition and Convention Center in Doha, Qatar. It set the stage for the round-robin group stage in Qatar, whence the World Cup will be played. The teams were divided into four pots of eight, with one team selected from each pot to form a group.

As hosts, Qatar took position A1 from Pot 1, where they were joined by the FIFA Ranking's seven highest-ranked qualified teams. The countries occupying positions 8 to 15 on the ranking of the qualified teams were allocated to Pot 2, while the 16th to 23rd best-ranked qualifiers were placed in Pot 3. Finally, Pot 4 included the qualified teams in positions 24 to 28, plus three placeholders representing the two winners of the intercontinental play-offs and the remaining UEFA play-off winners. The hosts continued to be placed in Pot 1 and treated as a seeded team, and therefore Pot 1 consisted of hosts Qatar and the seven highest-ranked teams that qualified for the tournament.

The draw sequence started with pot 1 and ended with pot 4.

Personnel involved 
The 32 nations involved in the 2022 World Cup (29 of which were known) were drawn into eight groups of four. Two of the remaining three spots were filled by the winners of the intercontinental play-offs on 13 or 14 June, with the third berth determined by Path A of the European qualifying play-offs, which was delayed due to the 2022 Russian invasion of Ukraine.

The draw was attended by 2,000 guests and was led by Carli Lloyd, Jermaine Jenas, and Samantha Johnson, assisted by the likes of Cafu (Brazil), Lothar Matthäus (Germany), Adel Ahmed Malalla (Qatar), Ali Daei (Iran), Bora Milutinović (Serbia/USA/Mexico), Jay-Jay Okocha (Nigeria), Rabah Madjer (Algeria), and Tim Cahill (Australia).

Seeding
Teams were seeded using the March 2022 FIFA World Rankings (shown in parentheses), which were published on 31 March 2022.

The highest-ranked team not to qualify for the World Cup, and also the only team from the top 16 in the rankings not to qualify, was sixth-ranked Italy.

Notes
 H : Hosts

Final draw

The eight groups were formed randomly, selecting one team from each of the four pots. Two teams from the same confederation could not be placed into the same group, with the exception of UEFA teams, where up to two teams could be in the same group. The only team whose position in the draw was predetermined was the host Qatar, who were placed into position A1.

See also
2018 FIFA World Cup seeding

Notes

References

Seeding
FIFA World Cup seeding